Burial places of justices of the Supreme Court of the United States are located across 25 states and the District of Columbia. The state with the most U.S. Supreme Court justice burial sites is Virginia with 2014 of which are at Arlington National Cemetery. Since it was established in 1789, 114 persons have served as a justice (associate justice or chief justice) on the Supreme Court; of these, 103 have died. The first death of a justice was that of James Wilson on August 21, 1798, and the most recent was that of Ruth Bader Ginsburg on September 18, 2020. William Howard Taft, who was chief justice from 1921 to 1930 after serving as president of the United States from 1909 to 1913, was the first justice for whom a state funeral has been held; Justice Ginsburg, who served as an associate justice from 1993 to 2020, was the second to receive this honor.

The sortable table below lists each deceased justice's place of burial, along with date of death, and the order of their membership on the Court. Five people served first as associate justices, and later as chief justices, separately: Charles Evans Hughes, William Rehnquist, John Rutledge, Harlan F. Stone, and Edward Douglass White. While having served in two positions, these individuals are listed only once in the table, and their order of justiceship (OJ) represents the overall order in which each began their initial service on the Court as an associate justice.

Supreme Court justice burial places

Notes

See also 
 List of burial places of presidents and vice presidents of the United States

References

Further reading

External links

 The Supreme Court of the United States and the Federal Judiciary, overview and resource links, Federal Judicial Center, Washington, D.C.

Burials
Burials
President United States
United States
Justices of the Supreme Court